In mathematics, a locally compact group is a topological group G for which the underlying topology is locally compact and Hausdorff. Locally compact groups are important because many examples of groups that arise throughout mathematics are locally compact and such groups have a natural measure called the Haar measure. This allows one to define integrals of Borel measurable functions on G so that standard analysis notions such as the Fourier transform and  spaces can be generalized.

Many of the results of finite group representation theory are proved by averaging over the group. For compact groups, modifications of these proofs yields similar results by averaging with respect to the normalized Haar integral. In the general locally compact setting, such techniques need not hold. The resulting theory is a central part of harmonic analysis. The representation theory for locally compact abelian groups is described by Pontryagin duality.

Examples and counterexamples
Any compact group is locally compact.
 In particular the circle group T of complex numbers of unit modulus under multiplication is compact, and therefore locally compact. The circle group historically served as the first topologically nontrivial group to also have the property of local compactness, and as such motivated the search for the more general theory, presented here.
Any discrete group is locally compact. The theory of locally compact groups therefore encompasses the theory of ordinary groups since any group can be given the discrete topology.
Lie groups, which are locally Euclidean, are all locally compact groups.
A Hausdorff topological vector space is locally compact if and only if it is finite-dimensional.
The additive group of rational numbers Q is not locally compact if given the relative topology as a subset of the real numbers. It is locally compact if given the discrete topology. 
The additive group of p-adic numbers Qp is locally compact for any prime number p.

Properties
By homogeneity, local compactness of the underlying space for a topological group need only be checked at the identity. That is, a group G is  a locally compact space if and only if the identity element has a compact neighborhood. It follows that there is a local base of compact neighborhoods at every point.

A topological group is Hausdorff if and only if the trivial one-element subgroup is closed.

Every closed subgroup of a locally compact group is locally compact. (The closure condition is necessary as the group of rationals demonstrates.) Conversely, every locally compact subgroup of a Hausdorff group is closed. Every quotient of a locally compact group is locally compact. The product of a family of locally compact groups is locally compact if and only if all but a finite number of factors are actually compact.

Topological groups are always completely regular as topological spaces. Locally compact groups have the stronger property of being normal.

Every locally compact group which is first-countable is metrisable as a topological group (i.e. can be given a left-invariant metric compatible with the topology) and complete. If furthermore the space is second-countable, the metric can be chosen to be proper. (See the article on topological groups.)

In a Polish group G, the σ-algebra of Haar null sets satisfies the countable chain condition if and only if G is locally compact.

Locally compact abelian groups 

For any locally compact abelian (LCA) group A, the group of continuous homomorphisms
Hom(A, S1)
from A to the circle group is again locally compact. Pontryagin duality asserts that this functor induces an equivalence of categories
LCAop → LCA.
This functor exchanges several properties of topological groups. For example, finite groups correspond to finite groups, compact groups correspond to discrete groups, and metrisable groups correspond to countable unions of compact groups (and vice versa in all statements).

LCA groups form an exact category, with admissible monomorphisms being closed subgroups and admissible epimorphisms being topological quotient maps. It is therefore possible to consider the K-theory spectrum of this category.  has shown that it measures the difference between the algebraic K-theory of Z and R, the integers and the reals, respectively, in the sense that there is a homotopy fiber sequence
K(Z) → K(R) → K(LCA).

See also

References

Further reading
 .
 
 
 
 
 
 

Topological groups